Dunmore  is a barony in County Galway, Republic of Ireland.

Etymology
Dunmore derives its name from the Conmhaícne Dúna Móir, meaning the "Conmaicne people of the great fortification".

Location

Dunmore barony is situated in north of County Galway, directly south of county Mayo.

History

Dunmore barony was part of the ancient tuath of Conmaicne Dunmore, one of the original Connacht tribes.

List of parishes

Below is the list of parishes in Dunmore barony:
 Addergoole
 Dunmore
 Kilbennan
 Kilconla
 Killererin
 Liskeevy
 Tuam

See also
 Conmaicne Dunmore
 Dunmore, County Galway

References

 

Baronies of County Galway